Nautosphaeria is a genus of fungi in the family Halosphaeriaceae.
 This is a monotypic genus, containing the single species Nautosphaeria cristaminuta.

References

Microascales
Monotypic Sordariomycetes genera